Syrnola endolamellata is a species of sea snail, a marine gastropod mollusk in the family Pyramidellidae, the pyrams and their allies.

Description
The shell of this species can be easily recognized by its low whorls. Furthermore, in contrast to most Eulimella species, there are four or five teeth, forming a ridge, on the inner part of the outer lip. These teeth can also be found in the following species : Eulimella angeli Peñas & Rolán, 1997, Eulimella boydae van Aartsen, Gittenberger & Goud, 2000 and Eulimella vanhareni van Aartsen, Gittenberger & Goud, 1998.

Distribution
This species occurs on the African side of the Atlantic Ocean, off Mauritania at depths between 30 m and 200 m.

References

 Peñas A. & Rolán E., 1999. La familia Pyramidellidae Gray, 1840 (Mollusca, Gastropoda, Heterostropha) en Africa Occidental. 4. los géneros Megastomia, Odostomia, Noemiamea y Syrnola. Iberus, suplemento 5: 1-150

External links
 To World Register of Marine Species

Pyramidellidae
Invertebrates of West Africa
Molluscs of the Atlantic Ocean
Gastropods described in 1994